There are several Eastern Orthodox colleges and universities in the United States. There are also a number of distance education programs affiliated with Eastern Orthodox churches in North America, and blended residency and online certification programs in theology or ministry.

Orthodox education has existed in North America since Russian colonization of Alaska in the late 18th Century, but has only existed in the United States since the early 20th Century.

Accreditation

Accreditation of Orthodox institutes of higher learning in the United States is not uniform.  Saint Herman's Orthodox Seminary of Alaska lost its accreditation as an institution of higher education in the 1990s, and now works under state authorization as an exempted religious institution.

Saint Herman's Orthodox Theological Seminary - Kodiak, Alaska; Diocese of Alaska, in The Orthodox Church in America.
The Patriarch Athenagoras Orthodox Institute - Berkeley, California
St. Athanasius Academy of Orthodox Theology - Elk Grove, California; Antiochian Orthodox Christian Archdiocese of North America.
The Antiochian House of Studies -Antiochian Orthodox Christian Archdiocese of North America.
St. Sava's Serbian Orthodox Seminary - Libertyville, Illinois
Holy Cross Greek Orthodox School of Theology - Brookline, Massachusetts; Greek Orthodox Archdiocese of America.
St. Sophia Ukrainian Orthodox Theological Seminary - South Bound Brook, New Jersey
Saint Vladimir's Orthodox Theological Seminary - Crestwood, New York; Orthodox Church in America
Holy Trinity Orthodox Seminary - Jordanville, New York; Russian Orthodox Church Outside Russia
Christ the Saviour Carpatho-Russian Seminary - Johnstown, Pennsylvania; American Carpatho-Russian Orthodox Diocese
Saint Tikhon's Orthodox Theological Seminary - South Canaan, Pennsylvania; The Orthodox Church in America
St. Photios Orthodox Theological Seminary - Etna, California (This school is a non-canonical, "Genuine Orthodox Church" institution).
University of Saint Katherine - San Marcos, California
(St. Athanasius and St. Cyril Theological School) - Newport Beach, California (This school is a non-canonical, Coptic institution).

Distance Education
St. Gregory Nazianzen Orthodox Theological Institute - Ecumenical Patriarchate 
The Pavel Florensky School of Theology and Ministry - An academic unit within the Euclid University Consortium. The Master's Degree in Orthodox Theology and Doctoral / Ph.D. programs are administered by a priest of the Ukrainian Orthodox Church of the USA (Patriarchate of Constantinople).
The Pastoral School of the Diocese of Chicago and Mid-America of the Russian Orthodox Church Outside of Russia offers diplomas in Pastoral Theology and Orthodox Studies.
St. Stephen's Course in Orthodox Theology - Antiochian Orthodox Christian Archdiocese of North America
The Antiochian House of Studies - Antiochian Orthodox Christian Archdiocese of North America
Great Martyr Euphemia Orthodox Theological Academy
St. Vladimir's Orthodox Theological Seminary - D. Min. Degree
Holy Trinity Orthodox Seminary of the Russian Orthodox Church Outside of Russia in Jordanville, NY, offers a four semester course of study leading to a Certificate in Theological Studies.

References

United States
Universities and colleges
Universities and colleges
Universities and colleges, United States